The PlayStation Vita is a handheld video game console released by Sony in 2011. The system, positioned as an attempt to appeal both traditional handhelds and mobile phone gaming, maintained a niche following through 2018, though failed to pick up on mainstream success, with production of systems and games scheduled to wrap up in 2019. While the Vita would go on to have over 1400 games released for it in its lifetime, its niche status also led to a considerable number of cancelled video games as well. The following games were initially announced as PlayStation Vita titles, however were subsequently cancelled or postponed indefinitely by developers or publishers.

Cancelled Vita games

References

Vita cancelled games

PlayStation Vita